Smithson is an unincorporated community in Big Creek Township, White County, in the U.S. state of Indiana.

History
Smithson was originally called Wheeler, and was laid out under that name on the farm of Hiram M. Wheeler when the Louisville, New Albany and Chicago Railway was extended to that point. The present name is derived from Bernard G. Smith, a Civil War veteran and early settler. Smithson was the name of the local post office which was established in 1880 and remained in operation until it was discontinued in 1931.

Geography

References

Unincorporated communities in White County, Indiana
Unincorporated communities in Indiana